Gainesville High School is a Prince William County, Virginia public high school in the census-designated placed, Gainesville, Virginia. Gainesville High School is the 13th High School in Prince William County Public Schools and was opened on August 21, 2021. It neighbors Gainesville Middle School which is one of its feeder schools. The school is in western Prince William County and was recently built.

References 

Home. (n.d.) Retrieved June 8, 2022
“PWCS Newest High School Will Be Named Gainesville High School | Prince William Living.”  Prince William Living, princewilliamliving.com, 11 June 2020
Foretek, Jared. “Public Gets a Glimpse of State-of-the-Art Gainesville High School | Headlines  Insidenova.Com.” INSIDENOVA.COM, www.insidenova.com, 4 Oct. 2021

External links 
Official Website
Prince William County Public Schools
PWCS High School Directory

Educational institutions established in 2021
Public high schools in Virginia
Schools in Prince William County, Virginia
2021 establishments in Virginia